Derek Ivor Edwin Lewis (10 June 1929 – 13 July 1953) was an English professional football player for Gillingham and Preston North End. He made 85 Football League appearances and was tipped as a future England international but died suddenly of a brain haemorrhage at the age of 24.

References

1929 births
1953 deaths
English footballers
Erith & Belvedere F.C. players
Fulham F.C. players
Bury Town F.C. players
Gillingham F.C. players
Preston North End F.C. players
Footballers from Edmonton, London
Association football forwards